Abominable Snowman is a common name for the Yeti, an apelike animal cryptid said to inhabit the Himalaya region of Nepal and Tibet.

Abominable Snowman may also refer to:

Fictional characters
 Abominable Snowman (comics), a fictional character in the Marvel Comics Universe
 Abominable Snowman, a character in the Bugs Bunny/Daffy Duck cartoon, The Abominable Snow Rabbit (1961), that spoofed the 1957 film
Abominable Snowman, a character in the Pixar film Monsters, Inc. (2001), voiced by John Ratzenberger
 Abominable Snowman, the name Jimmy gives to himself in Margaret Atwood's novel Oryx and Crake (2003)

Films and television
The Abominable Snowman (film), a 1957 British horror film, directed by Val Guest, and starring Forrest Tucker and Peter Cushing
The Abominable Snowmen (1967), a serial in the British science fiction television series Doctor Who

Literature
The Abominable Snowman of Pasadena (December 1995), the 38th book in author R.L. Stine's Goosebumps series
The Abominable Snowman (gamebook), a gamebook in the Choose Your Own Adventure series

See also
 Yeti (disambiguation)